Onomastus corbetensis, is a species of spider of the genus Onomastus. It is endemic to Sri Lanka.

References

External links
Onomastus corbetensis

Endemic fauna of Sri Lanka
Salticidae
Spiders of Asia
Spiders described in 2016